Zsolt Tatár (born 18 August 1981) is a Hungarian former professional tennis player.

Tatár reached career best rankings of 703 for singles and 776 for doubles while competing on the professional tour, mostly in ITF level tournaments. He made the singles quarter-finals of the 2001 Budapest Challenger, which was his best result on the ATP Challenger Tour, securing wins over Nicolas Coutelot and Lovro Zovko. In 2002 he represented Hungary in a Davis Cup tie in Luxembourg, losing a singles dead rubber to Gilles Kremer.

ITF Futures finals

Doubles: 3 (0–3)

See also
List of Hungary Davis Cup team representatives

References

External links
 
 
 

1981 births
Living people
Hungarian male tennis players